Parachela cyanea is a species of cyprinid in the genus Parachela. It is considered harmless to humans.

References

Cyprinid fish of Asia
Fish of Indonesia
Cyprinidae